The dusky tetraka (Xanthomixis tenebrosa) is a species of Old World warbler in the family Bernieridae.  It is found only in Madagascar.  Its natural habitat is subtropical or tropical moist lowland forests.  It is threatened by habitat loss.

In 2023, three individuals were discovered in northern Madagascar after it was assumed that the species had gone extinct due to threats to its habitat. Before then it was last seen in 1999.

References 

Malagasy warblers
dusky tetraka
Taxonomy articles created by Polbot
Fauna of the Madagascar lowland forests